Izenberge is a Belgian village in the province of West Flanders. Since a fusion in the seventies it belongs now to the larger agglomeration of Alveringem.  It's the home of the open-air museum Bachten De Kupe and a local museum of curiosities. Besides a picturesque Romanesque church, it also has a very beautiful baroque chapel, which is still a place of pilgrimage.

Events: in August there is the annual funfair with a flea market (15 August).

External links
  Open Air Museum Bachten De Kupe

Populated places in West Flanders
Alveringem